Telford Motorway Service Station was opened in 2004 off Junction 4 of the M54 Motorway, near the town of Telford, Shropshire, England. The services are located just to the east of Stafford Park Industrial Estate, and west of Shifnal.

It is the only service station on the motorway and, if travelling east, the last service station before Corley on the M6 or Frankley on the M5.

References

External links 
 Welcome Break - Telford
 Telford services - Motorway Services Online

Transport in Shropshire
Welcome Break motorway service stations
Shifnal